Survivor BG: Conquering Asia - Philippines was the fourth season of the Bulgarian reality television series Survivor BG. The season had 24 contestants competing against each other in the Philippines where they competed for rewards and immunity to avoid being eliminated themselves. After 52 days, the jury decided Georgi Kehayov to win 250,000 leva and the title of Sole Survivor. 

The hosts were Evtim Miloshev until the 22nd day and for the rest of the show was again Vladimir Karamazov. The season premiered on 22 September 2009 on bTV. The season final was aired on 21 December 2009 on bTV with Georgi Kehayov winning 250,000 leva and the title of Sole Survivor.

For the first time in any Survivor franchise, a contestant died - Noncho Vodenicharov suffered a fatal heart attack during filming.

Contestants

Characteristics
The fourth season of the show featured Leaders' battle and The Necklace of Tribal Predominance. In the original tribes each episode all the tribes must choose The Leader of the Tribe. Then, the leaders face each other in a challenge and the winner takes a reward (mostly food) and an Immunity Necklace for the next Tribal Council. After the Union, The Immunity challenge was replaced by a challenge for The Necklace of Tribal Predominance. The winner, as well as having immunity for the next council, have to choose four members of the tribe and give then The Black Vote Necklaces. After that, the tribe votes only for those four members and the one received the majority of the votes is eliminated. Also, this season featured The Exile Island. In this version of the show, this player sent on that island don't take part in the Tribal Council and cannot be eliminated. There is a battle each episode, in which two survivors take part: the one who is on the island at the moment and the one sent there by the winner of the reward challenge. The winner has the choice: to stay on the island and take provisions for several days or to go back to the main tribe.

Challenges

Tribal Phase

1.Contestant Noncho Vodenicharov died of a heart attack during filming.

Individual Phase

Black vote necklaces

Voting History

Tribal Phase

Individual Phase

See also

References

External links
 Official website

Bulgaria
2000s Bulgarian television series
2009 Bulgarian television series endings
Television shows filmed in the Philippines